East Street is a bus rapid transit station on the CTfastrak line, located off East Street (CT-175) in New Britain, Connecticut. It opened with the line on March 28, 2015. The station consists of two side platforms serving the busway, with two center passing lanes to allow express buses to pass buses stopped at the station. Along with Cedar Street, it serves Central Connecticut State University.

The New York and New England Railroad (and predecessor Hartford, Providence and Fishkill Railroad) served a station named Pratts at Allen Street. It opened around 1860 and was closed around 1890, replaced by nearby Claytons station.

References

External links

Buildings and structures in New Britain, Connecticut
CTfastrak
Transport infrastructure completed in 2015
2015 establishments in Connecticut
Bus stations in Hartford County, Connecticut